The black-billed thrush (Turdus ignobilis) is a bird in the family Turdidae native to Colombia and also scantily distributed across Venezuela, the Guiana Shield and the western Amazon.

Distribution and habitat
The species is the most common Turdus thrush of disturbed habitats in western Amazonia and on the Guianan Shield, occurring in Brazil, Colombia, Ecuador, Peru, Venezuela, and Bolivia. It inhabits a variety of habitats including clearings, savannas with gallery woodland, cerrado, humid forest borders, coffee plantations, and various other habitats under anthropogenic influence.

Ecology
The black-billed thrush feeds on terrestrial invertebrates (beetles and flies, worms, crickets and caterpillars) as well as berries and fruits. The bird inhabits the midstory of vegetation. It lays two eggs in a cup-shaped nest. Individuals are generally solitary.

References

black-billed thrush
Birds of Colombia
Birds of Venezuela
Birds of the Guianas
Birds of the Bolivian Amazon
Birds of the Ecuadorian Amazon
Birds of the Peruvian Amazon
black-billed thrush
Taxa named by Philip Sclater
Taxonomy articles created by Polbot